Boneh Balut may refer to:
 Boneh Balut, Kohgiluyeh and Boyer-Ahmad